Pinetop Country Club is a census-designated place (CDP) located in Navajo County, Arizona, United States.  The population was 1,794 at the 2010 census.

Geography
Pinetop Country Club is located at  (34.116332, −109.891051).

Demographics

As of the 2010 census, there were 1794 people living in the CDP: 887 male and 907 female. 349 were 19 years old or younger, 145 were ages 20–34, 234 were between the ages of 35 and 49, 576 were between 50 and 64, and the remaining 490 were aged 65 and above. The median age was 55.4 years.

The racial makeup of the CDP was 91.1% White, 2.7% American Indian, 1.1% Asian, 0.3% Native Hawaiians or Other Pacific Islander, 0.2% Black or African American, 3.0% Other, and 1.5% two or more races.  10.2% of the population were Hispanic or Latino of any race.

There were 805 households in the CDP, 558 family households (69.3%) and 237 non-family households (30.7%), with an average household size of 2.23. Of the family households, 495 were married couples living together, while there were 23 single fathers and 40 single mothers; the non-family households included 205 adults living alone: 88 male and 117 female.

The CDP contained 3,789 housing units, of which 805 were occupied and 2,984 were vacant.

As of July 2016, the average home value in Pinetop Country Club was $328,278. The average household income was $74,592, with a per capita income of $41,489.

References

Populated places in Navajo County, Arizona